Magoffin County is a county located in the U.S. state of Kentucky. As of the 2020 census, the population was 11,637. Its county seat is Salyersville. The county was formed in 1860 from adjacent portions of Floyd, Johnson, and Morgan Counties. It was named for Beriah Magoffin who was Governor of Kentucky (1859–62).

History
The area now encompassed by Kentucky's Magoffin County was first bounded in 1772, when all of what is now the state of Kentucky was in the frontier county of Fincastle County, Virginia. Fincastle was divided in 1776, with the western portion named Kentucky County, Virginia. In 1780, the Virginia legislature set aside all land in Kentucky County for soldiers who had served in the Revolutionary War. In 1780, Kentucky County was divided into 3 counties, Jefferson, Fayette, and Lincoln. Fayette County was divided in 1785, with part becoming Bourbon County. In 1792, the lower part of Bourbon County was partitioned off to form Clark County. The area was further divided in 1796 to form Montgomery County, with Fleming County being partitioned from the area in 1798. In 1800, Floyd County was created from portions of Fleming, Mason, and Montgomery Counties. In 1843, Johnson County was carved out of the previous Bath County area, which was created in 1811 from Montgomery County, and which lost a portion of its territory in 1843 for the creation of Johnson County.

In 1860, the Kentucky Legislature partitioned parts of Johnson, Floyd, and Morgan Counties, to create Magoffin County. Its boundaries have remained unchanged since that time.

Geography
It is watered by Licking River.

Adjacent counties
 Morgan County  (northwest)
 Johnson County  (northeast)
 Floyd County  (southeast)
 Knott County  (south)
 Breathitt County  (southwest)
 Wolfe County  (west)

Demographics

As of the 2010 United States Census, there were 13,333 people living in the county. 98.6% were White, 0.3% Native American, 0.1% Black or African American, 0.1% Asian, 0.2% of some other race and 0.7% of two or more races. 0.7% were Hispanic or Latino (of any race).

As of the census of 2000, there were 13,332 people, 5,024 households, and 3,858 families living in the county. The racial makeup of the county was 99.29% White, 0.15% Black or African American, 0.20% Native American, 0.08% Asian, 0.02% from other races, and 0.27% from two or more races.  0.42% of the population were Hispanic or Latino of any race. There is a significant Melungeon or mixed race group of Carmel Indians in Magoffin County. In a 2007 study by the U.S. Census Bureau, Magoffin County, along with Mitchell County in Iowa, was cited as the U.S. county having the largest percentage of individuals in the demographic category of "Non-Hispanic white alone."

There were 5,024 households, out of which 37.50% had children under the age of 18 living with them, 61.90% were married couples living together, 11.20% had a female householder with no husband present, and 23.20% were non-families. 21.40% of all households were made up of individuals, and 8.20% had someone living alone who was 65 years of age or older. The average household size was 2.62 and the average family size was 3.04.

In the county, the population was spread out, with 26.80% under the age of 18, 10.10% from 18 to 24, 30.20% from 25 to 44, 22.40% from 45 to 64, and 10.60% who were 65 years of age or older. The median age was 34 years. For every 100 females there were 97.20 males. For every 100 females age 18 and over, there were 94.40 males.

The median income for a household in the county was $19,421, and the median income for a family was $24,031. Males had a median income of $27,745 versus $18,354 for females. The per capita income for the county was $10,685.  About 31.20% of families and 36.60% of the population were below the poverty line, including 45.90% of those under age 18 and 29.10% of those age 65 or over.

Politics
Between 1932 and 2004, Magoffin County generally voted Democratic in presidential elections, however it has voted Republican since then. It voted for Democrat Andy Beshear for Governor in the 2019 election, but Republican for all other statewide offices.

Economy
The last active coal mine in Magoffin County closed in 2015. In 2022, the TipTop Coal Mine in Magoffin County reopened, making the total number of coal mines in the county one. Major employers now include several coal truck businesses.

Communities

 Elsie
 Falcon
 Foraker
 Fredville
 Gunlock
 Hendricks
 Ivyton
 Logville
 Royalton
 Salyersville (county seat)
 Sublett
 Swampton
 Wheelersburg
 Wonnie

Notable people
 Jimmy Flynt, co-founder of Hustler magazine
 Larry Flynt, publisher of Hustler magazine

See also

 Big Sandy Area Development District
 National Register of Historic Places listings in Magoffin County, Kentucky

References

External links
 Magoffin County Schools
 The Magoffin County Historical Society
 Sandy Valley Transportation Services, Inc.
 Magoffin History & Ancestry

 
Kentucky counties
Counties of Appalachia
1860 establishments in Kentucky
Populated places established in 1860